Soviet ship Dekabrist can refer to several vessels of the former Soviet Union

 , a pre-World War II submarine, lead vessel in her class
 , built as Japanese destroyer Hibiki, and seized after World War II
 , a Russian merchant ship sunk during World War II
 , a Liberty ship transferred to Soviet service during World War II

Ship names
Soviet Navy ship names